= Operation Nightfall =

Operation Nightfall can refer to:

- Operation Nightfall, a covert operation central to the first and third seasons of the TV series, 24
- Operation Knightfall, a military operation in the film, Star Wars Episode III: Revenge of the Sith
